Philippine cattle are the indigenous cattle breed found throughout the Philippines. It is a small breed with mature bulls weighing about 400 kg and mature cows weighing about 300 kg. The color ranges from grey to brown to fawn, with white spotting on some animals. The females are humpless, while males have a low hump. The breed is used for draught work and milk and beef production, although carabao are often preferred for draught work. Four breed types have been recognized, the Ilocos in northwestern Luzon, Batangas in southwestern Luzon, Iloilo on Panay island, and Batanes Black on the Batanes Islands between Luzon and Taiwan.

References

Cattle breeds
Cattle breeds originating in the Philippines